"Blasé" is a song by American singer Ty Dolla $ign featuring American rapper Future and American hip hop duo Rae Sremmurd, taken as the lead single from the former's debut studio album Free TC on June 26, 2015. Produced by DJ Spinz, Ty and Future split singing the chorus back and forth followed by an outro from Future.

Music video
On August 17, 2015, the singer confirmed that the music video for "Blasé" had been shot and will premiere "soon". On September 13, 2015, the music video for "Blasé" was released. The music video features cameo appearances from Tinashe and Dej Loaf and was filmed in Los Angeles and Philadelphia. The video includes footage of Rae Sremmurd in Philadelphia's Chinatown as well as a live performance by Ty Dolla Sign. Ty's energetic live performance featured in the video, as well as the video's intentionally amateur film quality, is inspired by and reminiscent of 1980s hardcore punk shows and specifically the live performances of the band Bad Brains and the filmed performance of the Bad Brains at CBGB in 1982.

Remixes
On September 20, 2015, Canadian rapper Drake premiered a remix by OVO Sound signee PartyNextDoor on his Beats 1 Radio show, OVOSound Radio. On December 11, 2015, the two official remixes of "Blasé" were released. The first remix version features Young Jeezy, Juicy J and Diddy, while the second remix features T.I., French Montana and ASAP Ferg.

Track listing
Digital download
"Blasé"  (Explicit) – 4:46
"Blasé"  (Clean) – 4:46

Charts

Weekly charts

Certifications

Release history

References

External links

2015 songs
2015 singles
Songs written by Swae Lee
Ty Dolla Sign songs
Future (rapper) songs
Rae Sremmurd songs
Atlantic Records singles
Songs written by Future (rapper)
Songs written by Ty Dolla Sign
Songs written by DJ Spinz
Songs written by Slim Jxmmi
Films shot in Philadelphia